WFIX (91.3 FM, "The Fix") is a radio station licensed to serve Florence, Alabama, United States.  The station is owned by Tri-State Inspirational Broadcasting and serves the greater Florence-Muscle Shoals area. It airs a Contemporary Christian music format.

The station was assigned the WFIX call letters by the Federal Communications Commission on June 23, 2000.

Daily Programming:
"The Morning Fix" hosted by Mark & Michelle (6am-10am)
"Middays With Michelle" hosted by Michelle Pyle (10am-2pm)
"Afternoon Drive" hosted by Heath (2pm-6pm)
"The Fix Night Time" hosted by James Dancer (6pm-12am)
"The Over Nights" (12am-4am)
"In His Presence" (4am-6am)

Other Active Personalities:
Richard Parker
Casey Jones 
James Moody
Allen Stout

Former Personalities:
David Michael
Christy Pepper
Mike West
John David Crow
Wade Hacker
Jason Fox
Kris Kelly

References

External links

Contemporary Christian radio stations in the United States
Lauderdale County, Alabama
Radio stations established in 2000
FIX